Pajamas are a type of loose garment.

Pajamas or pyjamas may also refer to:
 Pajamas (film), a 1927 American comedy
 Pyjamas (software) or Pyjs, a web framework

See also 
 Pyjamas coup, a 1975 coup d'etat attempt in Greece
 Pajamas Media or PJ Media, a blog hosting company
 Pyjama shark, a fish species
 Vasco Pyjama, a cartoon character